"U Played" is a song by American rapper Moneybagg Yo featuring American rapper Lil Baby. It was released on January 3, 2020 as the second single from Moneybagg Yo's third studio album Time Served (2020). The song was produced by Tay Keith.

Composition 
Charlie Zhang of Hypebeast has described the production of the song having a "a mid-tempo trap beat laced with blaring 808s, ghoulish synths and crisp snares." Alex Zidel of HotNewHipHop wrote that Moneybagg Yo is "fully flexing an avoidant attachment style" and "refusing to get too close to his potential lover" in the hook. Lil Baby is "showing off his diamond teeth" and "delivering yet another impressive display."

Charts 
On the week of January 25, 2020, "U Played" peaked at numbers 23 and 53 on both the Billboard Hot R&B/Hip-Hop Songs and Hot 100 charts respectively, remaining on both charts for five weeks.

Certifications

References 

2020 singles
2020 songs
Moneybagg Yo songs
Lil Baby songs
Interscope Records singles
Songs written by Lil Baby
Songs written by Tay Keith
Song recordings produced by Tay Keith